Still Alive at the Veglia Lounge is the debut EP from Canadian underground hip hop producer Stigg of the Dump. It was released on Endemik Music in 2002.

Reception
Tiny Mix Tapes praised the EP as "an overlooked album with a flash of greatness that wasn’t fully appreciated."

Track listing

References

External links
 
 

Alternative hip hop EPs
2002 debut albums
Stigg of the Dump albums